Philadelphia is an unincorporated community and census-designated place in western Marion County, Missouri, United States. It is located approximately ten miles west of Palmyra on Route 168. The community is part of the Hannibal Micropolitan Statistical Area.

Philadelphia was platted in 1835. The community was named after Philadelphia, Pennsylvania. A post office called Philadelphia has been in operation since 1847.

Demographics

References

Unincorporated communities in Marion County, Missouri
Hannibal, Missouri micropolitan area
Unincorporated communities in Missouri